A bridie or Forfar bridie is a Scottish meat pasty that originates from Forfar, Scotland.

History and preparation

Bridies are said "to have been 'invented' by a Forfar baker in the 1850s". The name may refer to the pie's frequent presence on wedding menus, or to Margaret Bridie of Glamis, "who sold them at the Buttermarket in Forfar". Bakers in Forfar traditionally use shortcrust pastry for their bridies, but in other parts of Scotland, flaky pastry is sometimes substituted. The filling of a bridie consists of minced steak, butter, and beef suet seasoned with salt and pepper. It is sometimes made with minced onions. Before being baked, the bridie's filling is placed on pastry dough, which is then folded into a semi-circular shape; finally, the edges are crimped. If the baker pokes one hole in the top of a bridie, this indicates that it is plain, or without onions; two holes means that it does contain onions, a convention which is applied also to a Scotch pie.

Cultural references
The bridie is the subject of the Dundee Scots shibboleth Twa bridies, a plen ane  an ingin ane an a (Two bridies, a plain one and an onion one as well).

Forfar Athletic Football Club, who play in the Scottish Professional Football League, have a bridie as their mascot.

See also

Scotch pie - the most common pastry snack in Scotland 
 Pasty - Cornish equivalent
 Turnover (food) - a sweet or savory filled pastry

References

British pies
Savoury pies
Scottish cuisine
Forfar